Somatolita neavei is a species of beetle in the family Cerambycidae, and the only species in the genus Somatolita. It was described by Per Olof Christopher Aurivillius in 1914.

References

Apomecynini
Beetles described in 1914
Monotypic beetle genera